The Ohio Seventh District Court of Appeals is one of the twelve Ohio District Courts of Appeal, the state intermediate appellate courts of Ohio. It has jurisdiction over eight counties: Belmont, Carroll, Columbiana, Harrison, Jefferson, Mahoning, Monroe, and Noble.

When a lower court in one of those eight counties has issued a final appealable order, the parties generally have the right to one appeal to the court of appeals.  A further appeal may be attempted to the Ohio Supreme Court (which has discretionary jurisdiction and elects to hear a comparably small number of cases).

Judges 

The Seventh District Court of Appeals is composed of four judges, each elected to six-year terms by the citizens of the eight counties in the district. Ohio Law requires that a person running for election as an appellate judge must have been licensed as an attorney in Ohio for at least six years or have served as a judge in any jurisdiction for at least six years. The current judges of the court (as of October 2022) are:

Attorney Mark A. Hanni (R) was elected on November 8, 2022, defeating Gene Donofrio (D). He will take office on February 9, 2023.

Each case on appeal is decided by a panel of three judges. Cases are decided through a review of the record of the inferior court or tribunal, as informed by the briefs submitted by the parties and by oral argument (if requested by either party).  New evidence is not permitted to be introduced on appeal.

Seventh District Court of Appeals Building 

In June 2006, the Seventh District Court of Appeals unveiled a new courthouse in downtown Youngstown, Ohio. From 1912 until 2006 the court had been located nearby on the fourth floor of the Mahoning County Courthouse. The Court address is 131 West Federal Street, Youngstown, Ohio 44503.

Notes

Ohio state courts
Ohio Supreme Court
State appellate courts of the United States
1912 establishments in Ohio
Courts and tribunals established in 1912